Claudio Rodríguez Cataldo (born 1 May 1950) is a Chilean business manager and politician who served as deputy.

References

External Links
 BCN Profile 

1954 births
Living people 
20th-century Chilean politicians
Pontifical Catholic University of Valparaíso alumni
National Renewal (Chile) politicians